Mark Lilla (born 1956) is an American political scientist, historian of ideas, journalist, and professor of humanities at Columbia University in New York City.  A self-described liberal, he frequently, though not always, presents views from that perspective.

A frequent contributor to the New York Review of Books, The New York Times, and publications worldwide, he is best known for his books The Once and Future Liberal: After Identity Politics, The Reckless Mind: Intellectuals in Politics, The Stillborn God: Religion, Politics, and the Modern West, and The Shipwrecked Mind: On Political Reaction.  After holding professorships at New York University and the Committee on Social Thought at the University of Chicago, he joined Columbia University in 2007 as Professor of the Humanities.  He lectures widely and has delivered the Weizmann Memorial Lecture in Israel, the Carlyle Lectures at Oxford University, and the MacMillan Lectures on Religion, Politics, and Society at Yale University.

Early life and education
Lilla was born in Detroit, Michigan, in 1956.  After briefly attending Wayne State University, he graduated from the University of Michigan in 1978 with a degree in economics and political science.  While attending Harvard's John F. Kennedy School of Government he began working in journalism, and after graduating in 1980 with a Master of Public Policy degree, he became an editor of the public policy quarterly The Public Interest, where he remained until 1984. Returning to Harvard, Lilla worked with sociologist Daniel Bell and political theorists Judith Shklar and Harvey Mansfield, receiving his Doctor of Philosophy degree in government in 1990. Lilla was formerly married to art historian Isabelle Frank, with whom he has a daughter, Sophie Marie Lilla, born in 1994. He is now married to the artist Diana Cooper.

Career
The recurring theme of Lilla's writings is the contested heritage of the modern Enlightenment.  His first book, G. B. Vico: The Making of an Anti-Modern examines an early figure in the European Counter-Enlightenment, and has an affinity with the works of Isaiah Berlin; with Ronald Dworkin and Robert B. Silvers, he edited the memorial volume, The Legacy of Isaiah Berlin in 2001. In the 1990s he wrote widely on twentieth-century European philosophy, editing with Thomas Pavel the New French Thought series at Princeton University Press, and writing The Reckless Mind, a meditation on the "philotyrannical" bent of twentieth-century continental philosophy. His wide-ranging study of modern political theology, The Stillborn God, based on the Carlyle Lectures delivered at Oxford University in 2003, was named one of the "100 best books of the year" by The New York Times Book Review and one of the 150 best books of the year by Publishers Weekly. In 2015, he received the Overseas Press Club of America's award for Best Commentary on International News for a series of articles in The New York Review of Books on the French response to the terrorist attacks of that year. Those articles became part of The Shipwrecked Mind: On Political Reaction, a study of how nostalgia has shaped modern politics, from Middle America to the Middle East. In recent years he has also been involved in public debates over the future of American liberalism and the Democratic Party, which is the focus of The Once and Future Liberal.

Bibliography

Books

Book reviews

See also

American philosophy
List of American philosophers

References

External links

New York Review of Books - Books and articles at New York Review of Books authored by Lilla
Columbia University  - Lilla's current Columbia University homepage
Curriculum vitae

Writers from Detroit
American philosophers
American male non-fiction writers
University of Michigan College of Literature, Science, and the Arts alumni
Harvard Kennedy School alumni
New York University faculty
University of Chicago faculty
Columbia University faculty
1956 births
Living people
Isaiah Berlin scholars